Özcan Ediz (born 27 July 1974) is a Turkish archer. He competed in the men's individual and team events at the 1992 Summer Olympics.

References

1974 births
Living people
Turkish male archers
Olympic archers of Turkey
Archers at the 1992 Summer Olympics
Place of birth missing (living people)